Walter Enrique Claverí Alvarado is a Guatemalan football coach. He debuted in the 2018 FIFA World Cup qualification match against United States. Claverí was a member of the Guatemalan team that won a bronze medal at the 1983 Pan American Games.

References

1957 births
Living people
Guatemalan footballers
Guatemalan football managers
People from Suchitepéquez Department
Guatemala national football team managers
Pan American Games bronze medalists for Guatemala
Pan American Games medalists in football
Footballers at the 1983 Pan American Games
Medalists at the 1983 Pan American Games
Association footballers not categorized by position